Prakob Chirakiti FRPSL is a Thai philatelist who was appointed to the Roll of Distinguished Philatelists in 2019. He is a specialist in the philately of Thailand and the secretary of the Grand Prix Club. He is the president of the Federation of Inter-Asian Philately executive committee for 2017–2021.

References

Prakob Chirakiti
Living people
Signatories to the Roll of Distinguished Philatelists
Philatelic authors
Year of birth missing (living people)
Fellows of the Royal Philatelic Society London
Philately of Thailand